The Constant Nymph is a play based on the 1924 novel of the same name by Margaret Kennedy. The stage version, adapted by Kennedy and the director Basil Dean, was first performed in London in 1926, starring Noël Coward, Edna Best and Cathleen Nesbitt. It portrays the love of two women for a young composer, and the conflicts that arise. The tragic ending has the younger of the two – a teenager – die of heart failure.

Background and premiere
Kennedy's novel, published in 1924, was a critical and popular success. The Times described it as "a beautiful piece of craftsmanship, built with rare firmness and economy … a genuine work of art". For the West End premiere of the stage adaptation, John Gielgud was cast in the central role of Lewis Dodd, but before rehearsals began, the producer and director, Basil Dean, found that Noël Coward – then a bigger star than the young Gielgud – was available, and he demoted Gielgud to the position of understudy. Coward's health gave way three weeks after the premiere, and Gielgud took over the part for the rest of the run.

The play opened at the New Theatre (since 2006 retitled the Noël Coward Theatre) on 14 September 1926. Music plays an important part in the play, and Dean commissioned a score by Eugene Goossens. The first night was attended by authors including Arnold Bennett, John Galsworthy, Somerset Maugham and H. G. Wells. The production ran for nearly a year, before going on tour.

The original cast was:

Lewis Dodd – Noël Coward
Linda Cowland – Mary Clare
Kate Sanger – Marie Ney
Kiril Trigorin – Aubrey Mather
Teresa Sanger – Edna Best
Paulina Sanger – Helen Spencer
Jacob Birnbaum – Kenneth Kent
Antonia Sanger – Elissa Landi
Roberto – Tony de Lungo

Florence Churchill – Cathleen Nesbitt
Charles Churchill – Cecil Parker
Sir Barthelmy Pugh – Aubrey Mather
Peveril Leyburn – Harold Scott
Erda Leyburn – Margaret Steveking
Dr Dawson – Craighall Sherry
Lydia Mainwaring – Marjorie Gabain
Major Robert Mainwaring – David Hawthorne
Madame Marxse – Margaret Yarde

Plot
Lewis Dodd is a young composer. His late mentor, Albert Sanger, had several daughters, one of whom, the teenage schoolgirl Teresa, suffers from a heart defect. She is in love with Lewis, but he falls for her cousin, Florence Churchill, who, after Albert's death, comes to look after the anarchic Sanger family. Lewis and Florence marry, but the marriage is full of tensions, and she is well aware, as he is not, until later in the play, of Teresa's feelings for him. Florence's conflict between her concerned instincts towards her cousins and her controlling instincts, possessiveness and snobbery is a key point of the plot. Lewis come to realise his love for Teresa, but she dies of heart failure, leaving him bereft.

Critical reception
The Times thought the adaptation well done, but regretted that turning the novel into a play necessarily removed some of its subtleties and ambiguities. The paper's reviewer found that the anarchic Sangers and Dodd were shown in a more unequivocally favourable light than in the novel and the unkind aspects of Florence's nature portrayed more strongly than her kindnesses. The Stage thought much less of the novel than did The Times ("cannot be classed much above … Ethel M. Dell"), and found the dramatisation "episodical in treatment", though the reviewer predicted a popular success. The Era called the play "one of those rare events in the theatre, a really satisfactory and satisfying dramatisation of a novel … there is not a trace of sentimentality".

Notes, references and sources

Notes

References

Sources

External links
Full text of The Constant Nymph at HathiTrust Digital Library

1926 plays
British plays
Plays by Margaret Kennedy
West End plays